The Australian Government Publishing Service (AGPS) was an Australian Government publishing service that operated from 1970 to 1997 and was the sole centralised Australian Government publishing and printing service. It also had retail outlets for government publications in all state capital cities of Australia.

It also produced manuals, and publications specifically oriented towards publishing.

Closure
In 1997 the production facilities of AGPS, including the Commonwealth Government Printing Office, was closed down. The business was sold to CanPrint Communications Pty Ltd.

After the sale, the printing, publishing and distribution  was the responsibility of each individual government department or agency.

The few remaining functions of AGPS were taken over by its successor, AusInfo, part of the then new Department of Finance and Administration. The AusInfo website has been archived via a webpage snapshot on Trove.

References

Publishing companies of Australia
Defunct Commonwealth Government agencies of Australia
State publishers
Australian companies disestablished in 1997
Australian companies established in 1970